Mirinda is a brand of soft drink originally created in Spain in 1959 and distributed globally by PepsiCo since 1970. Its name comes from the Esperanto translation of "admirable" or "amazing".

It is available in many fruit varieties, like orange, apple, strawberry, among others. It is part of a beverage area often referred to as the flavour segment, comprising carbonated and non-carbonated fruit-flavoured beverages. The orange flavour of Mirinda now represents the majority of Mirinda sales worldwide following a major repositioning of the brand towards that flavour in the early 1990s.

American beverage company PepsiCo acquired the Mirinda brand in 1970 and markets it primarily outside the United States. It competes with The Coca-Cola Company's Fanta and Dr Pepper Snapple Group's Crush with flavour brands localized to individual countries. As with most soft drinks, Mirinda is available in multiple formulations of flavour, carbonation and sweetener depending on the taste of individual markets.

Names 
Mirinda, being a drink with presence around the world, is also known with many other names:  Tams (South Korea), Sukita (Brazil), Yedigun (Turkey), Slam (Italy), Sisi (Netherlands), Kas (Spain), Frustyle (Russia), Horoyoipop (Japan), 美年达 (China), Sol (Mexico and some US states)

History 
Mirinda was originally produced in Spain. It became available in the United States in late 2003 in bilingual packaging, and initially sold at a reduced price, presumably to become a competitor against Coke's Fanta brand. Since 2005, Mirinda flavours have largely been sold under the Tropicana Twister Soda brand in the United States except in Guam, where Pepsi began selling it under the Mirinda brand in 2007 (replacing Chamorro Punch Orange). 

PepsiCo also tried to sell Mirinda in Brazil in late 1996, but the brand was discontinued in 1998 after weak sales, keeping the local brand Sukita under production. 

In Italy, it has been sold under the brand Slam until 2021, when it was renamed. Mirinda has been sold in Russia since the early 1990s.

Advertising and recent events 
Mirinda campaigns over the years have included the "Mirinda Woman" campaign in the 1970s.  The "Mirinda Craver"" ads produced by Jim Henson from 1975 to 1978 involved a monster called the Mirinda Craver (performed by Bob Payne and voiced by Allen Swift) craving the Mirinda drinks and doing anything to obtain one. With the Mirinda Craver being a live-hand Muppet, Payne was assisted in performing the Mirinda Craver by Louise Gold, Dave Holman, or Faz Fazakas, handling one of the arms, moving eyes and twirling hair of the Mirinda Craver.

A campaign between 1994 and 1996 used the tag-line "The Taste is in Mirinda" with the Blue Man Group. In some markets, including Mexico, the Blue Man Group campaign re-launched Mirinda away from a multi-flavour positioning to a brand solely focused on the orange flavour. The Blue Man Group campaign showed the Blue Man Group competing to drink orange Mirinda and celebrating a successful drink with an open-mouth exclamation of 'Mirindaaaa'. Also in Mexico, Mirinda launched a campaign with the Pokémon anime series aimed at children with a promotion of gadgets with the characters of the manga series.

Mirinda advertising campaigns have been handled by Pepsi's stable of creative agencies, including BBDO and J. Walter Thompson.

Mirinda has good sales in India. It uses "Pagalpanti Bhi Zaruri Hai" ("Madness is also needed" in Hindi) as sales tagline while Indian actress Asin is the brand ambassador of Mirinda in India. It also launched the "Mirinda Pagalpanti League" campaign in India to connect youths around the nation and share their fun stories on TV commercials.   Coca-Cola's brand Fanta is the major competitor of Mirinda in the Indian markets. The most popular flavours of Mirinda in India include orange and lime.

Mirinda regularly introduces special movie-themed editions in Asia. Recent ones included Batman (blueberry) and Superman (fruit punch). Mirinda has also recently released a new flavour of drinks called Mirinda creme. They come in three flavours: mango, raspberry and lime.

Mirinda was briefly sold in Australia during the 1990s. In the 1990s, KFC in Australia switched from the Coca-Cola to the Pepsi family of soft drinks. It then sold Mirinda Orange and Mirinda Lemon, before later changing to Sunkist and Solo when the Australian Pepsi bottler gained the rights to the Schweppes/Dr Pepper brands. In the 2010s and 2020s, Mirinda syrups were available at Big W department stores.

Mirinda is no longer sold in New Zealand, replaced with the introduction of PepsiCo's new Mountain Dew range of similar flavours (Code Red, Live Wire, Pitch Black, Electro Shock and Passionfruit Frenzy). , Clendon New World and Countdown supermarkets were bringing back Mirinda with their two flavours raspberry and orange, but it was unknown whether this was only for a limited sale or a permanent official return.

In the Arab world, Mirinda has been available since the late 1970s, with the Gulf states and Egypt as its biggest markets. Mirinda is also sold in France in Arab stores, Arab fast food restaurants and also in some of the large French  hypermarkets such as Carrefour, Auchan and Géant.

See also
 Miranda

References

PepsiCo soft drinks
Orange sodas
Spanish cuisine
Drink brands